Rada'a is a sub-district located in Radda District, Al Bayda Governorate, Yemen.  Rada'a had a population of 54714  according to the 2004 census.

References 

Sub-districts in Radda District